is a city located in Ibaraki Prefecture, Japan. , the city had an estimated population of 59,314 in 21,168 households and a population density of 480 persons per km². The percentage of the population aged over 65 was 38.8%. The city has a large expatriate population from Brazil.

Geography
Jōsō is located in southwestern Ibaraki Prefecture, approximately 50 kilometers north of central Tokyo and 70 kilometers from the prefectural capital at Mito. Most of the city is flat, with an average elevation of 10 to 20 meters above sea level. The Kinugawa River flows through the city.

Surrounding municipalities
Ibaraki Prefecture
 Tsukuba
 Tsukubamirai
Bandō
 Shimotsuma
Moriya
Yachiyo
Chiba Prefecture
Noda

Climate
Jōsō has a Humid continental climate (Köppen Cfa) characterized by warm summers and cool winters with light snowfall.  The average annual temperature in Jōsō is 14.2 °C. The average annual rainfall is 1302 mm with September as the wettest month. The temperatures are highest on average in August, at around 26.2 °C, and lowest in January, at around 3.1 °C.

Demographics
Per Japanese census data, the population of Jōsō peaked around the year 200 and has declined slightly since.

History
During the Edo period, the area was part of Shimōsa Province, and Mitsukaido village developed as a center for river transportation on the Kinugawa River. The town of Mitsukaidō was established within Toyoda District with the creation of the modern municipalities system on April 1, 1889. The area was transferred to Yūki District in 1894. On July 10, 1954 Mitsukaidō merged with the villages of Sugawara, Ohanawa, Mitsuma, Goka, Ono and Sakate, and was elevated to city status. It further annexed the villages of Sugao and Uchimoriya on April 1, 1956.

On January 1, 2006, Mitsukaidō absorbed the neighboring town of Ishige, Yūki District, Ibaraki and officially changed their name to Jōsō. The area suffered much damage from flooding of the Kinugawa River due to heavy rains in September 2015.

Government
Jōsō has a mayor-council form of government with a directly elected mayor and a unicameral city council of 22 members. Jōsō, together with neighboring Yachiyo, contributes two members to the Ibaraki Prefectural Assembly. In terms of national politics, the city is part of Ibaraki 7th district of the lower house of the Diet of Japan.

Economy
Jōsō has a mixed economy, with three large industrial parks; however, 50% of the city's area is farmland.

Education
Jōsō has 14 public elementary schools and five public middle schools operated by the city government, and three public high schools operated by the Ibaraki Prefectural Board of Education.

In additional there are two Brazilian schools: Escola e Creche Grupo Opção and Escola Taiyo  One more Brazilian primary school (UBEK – Unidade Brasileira de Ensino Kanto) is now closed

Transportation

Railway
Kantō Railway Jōsō Line
 -  -  -  -  -  -

Highway

Local attractions

Notable people from Jōsō 
Michiko Hada, actress
Yuko Matsuoka,– comedian
Takayuki Okada, professional motorcycle racer
Keiji Suzuki, judoka
Takashi Ono, judoka
Kazuhiko Hosokawa, professional golfer
Tomi Okawa, table tennis player
Takashi Nagatsuka, writer, poet
Akira Kazami, politician
Atsushi Koyano, scholar of contemporary literature

References

External links

Official Website 

Cities in Ibaraki Prefecture
Jōsō, Ibaraki